Paşayurdu is a village in the Çayırlı District, Erzincan Province, Turkey. The village is populated by Kurds of the Kurêşan and Lolan tribes and had a population of 32 in 2021. The hamlet of Aşağıyaylalar is attached to the village.

References 

Villages in Çayırlı District
Kurdish settlements in Erzincan Province